Apocalyptic is from the word apocalypse, referring to the end of the world.

Apocalyptic may also refer to:

 Apocalyptic literature, a genre of religious writing
 Apocalyptic and post-apocalyptic fiction, a subgenre of science fiction, science fantasy or horror fiction involving global catastrophic risk
 Apocalypticism, the belief that the end of time is near
Apocalyptic (album), a 2010 album by the Swedish death metal band Evocation
"Apocalyptic" (song), a 2015 song by the American hard rock band Halestorm

See also
 Apocalypse (disambiguation)